Inside Philanthropy is a news website about large philanthropic foundations and wealthy donors, created by David Callahan in 2013.

The site issues its own set of awards, such as the Philanthropist of the Year award and the Boldest Philanthropic Vision award.

The site has been noted for naming wealthy people who Inside Philanthropy considers as scoring relatively poorly on "relative generosity", or percentage of wealth that a person has given away, even if they still give out a comparatively large amount of money in absolute terms.

References

External links
InsidePhilanthropy.com

American financial news websites
Internet properties established in 2013